Raijada or Raizada are one of the Rajput clans of Gujarat. They are off-shoot of Chudasama Rajputs.  The name Raijada was adopted by one Bhupatsinh, son of Ra' Mandlik, who was given jagir of Sorath The Raijada, Rana, Sarvaiya and Chudasama consider themselves brothers, they off-shoot branches from Chudasama, so they do not intermarry, as per their Rajput traditions. Until independence of India, they held extensive Jagirs near Keshod and Chorwad in Sorath.

References

Rajput clans of Gujarat
Samma tribes
Chudasama dynasty